Terrence Cardene Murphy (born December 15, 1982) is a former American football wide receiver and return specialist. He played college football at Texas A&M University and professionally in the National Football League (NFL) with the Green Bay Packers.

Playing career

High school
Murphy attended Chapel Hill High School in Tyler, Texas where he had a core GPA of 3.6. He also played quarterback and in his two years at quarterback he passed for more than 2,500 yards, rushed for over 1,100 yards and totaled over 25 touchdowns in combined seasons at Chapel Hill. He was the Offensive 16-4A District MVP in 2000 and signed with Texas A&M. He was the first and only Tyler Chapel Hill player to be drafted in the first two rounds of the NFL Draft.

College
Murphy attended Texas A&M University, where he became one of the best receivers in school history. He was two-time 1st Team All-Big 12 (wide receiver and kick returner) and was three-time Academic All-Big 12 in his four seasons at A&M. He switched to wide receiver and returned kickoffs after never playing either position before in his career. He was a team captain twice, in 2003 and 2004, and finished his career with a school record 172 receptions for 2,600 yards (15.1 yards per rec. avg.) and ten touchdowns, 17 rushing attempts for 209 yards (12.3 yards per rush avg.), and 31 kickoff returns for 761 yards (24.55 yards per kickoff ret. avg). He finished his career with 3,615 total all-purpose yards in four seasons, most ever by an Aggie receiver. He was named to Sporting News All-American Team twice in his career, in 2001 and 2003. He is the Texas A&M record holder in the vertical jump (for all varsity sports including basketball) with a jump of 42 inches. He was named to the Texas A&M All-Decade Team. He played in two bowl games during his career, the 2001 Galleryfurniture.com Bowl and the 2005 Cotton Bowl Classic. He also was the first wide receiver to break 2,000 receiving yards in school history.

NFL
Murphy was selected in the second round (pick 58) of the 2005 NFL Draft by the Green Bay Packers. He played in three games in the regular season, catching five passes for 36 yards. He was injured in October of his rookie year on a helmet-to-helmet hit from the Carolina Panthers' Thomas Davis during a kickoff return and subsequently placed on injured reserve. Murphy's teammate Najeh Davenport fumbled on the return, and when Murphy tried to retrieve the ball, he was hit hard by Davis. Tests later showed Murphy has spinal stenosis, a narrowing of the spine near the neck. As a result, the Packers released Murphy on April 20, 2006. On April 19, 2007, Murphy officially announced his retirement from the NFL.

Coaching career
Murphy also served as a coaching intern for the Green Bay Packers.

Post-coaching
After retiring from the NFL, Murphy relocated back to College Station. He is involved in the community of Bryan-College Station, and has also started a few different business endeavors. He is the CEO, Broker for TM5 Properties, a real estate company specializing in residential, land and investments in Brazos County, Texas.

References

External links
 

1982 births
Living people
American football return specialists
American football wide receivers
Green Bay Packers players
Texas A&M Aggies football players
Sportspeople from Tyler, Texas
Players of American football from Texas